The 2022 New Zealand Radio Awards are the awards for excellence in the New Zealand radio industry during 2021. It was the 45th New Zealand Radio Awards, recognising staff, volunteers and contractors in both commercial and non-commercial broadcasting.

References

New Zealand Radio Awards